Voices of Goldstein is a community group that is part of the wider Voices movement in Australia.

History 
The Voices movement began in Indi in an effort to have local voices heard by their local member of parliament. When they felt they were not being listened to, they ran an ultimately successful campaign to get an independent elected to parliament.

In 2021 a group in the Melbourne electorate of Goldstein wanted their views better represented with the local member, Tim Wilson, on the issue of climate and government integrity.

In November 2021 the group announced that they would endorse Zoe Daniel as their candidate for the 2022 federal election.

Reactions

Endorsements 
The group was endorsed by Ian Macphee, the first member for Goldstein, and a minister in the Liberal Fraser Government. In his endorsement Macphee said "I believe grassroots activity is imperative and can be done by supporting good independent candidates."

Opposition 
The Liberal party has opposed Voices of Goldstein on the grounds that their support and money is coming from supporters of the Greens and the Extinction Rebellion. These claims are countered by the group who claim that they also have many disaffected Liberals as members as well as members of Labor and Greens.

See also 
Cathy McGowan
Voices for Indi
Voices groups in Australia
Zoe Daniel

References

Participatory democracy
Political advocacy groups in Australia